Graveney School is a secondary school and sixth form with academy status in the Furzedown area of Tooting, southwest London, England. The school has a partially selective admissions policy. At the beginning of 2015 Graveney was assessed in an Ofsted inspection report as outstanding.

History
Whilst Graveney School can trace its origins back to a school founded in the late 1660s by Sir Walter St John, 3rd Baronet, in Battersea, the modern Graveney was established in 1986 as an amalgamation of Ensham School (for girls) and Furzedown Secondary School (mixed). Furzedown was itself formed in 1977 as an amalgamation of Battersea Grammar School (for boys) and Rosa Bassett School (for girls).

Created as a standard comprehensive school under the control of the local education authority (initially the ILEA, later Wandsworth), a significant change occurred in 1991 when Graveney became a grant-maintained school, giving far greater control to the school governors. Following the changes resulting from the School Standards and Framework Act 1998, which abolished grant-maintained status, the school preserved a degree of independence by electing to become a foundation school.

The school achieved Technology College status in 1995 and also moved to a partially selective admissions policy in September of that year. From the introduction of selection the school was permitted to choose up to 50% of pupils by ability; however, this was reduced to 25% in 2000, increased to 30% in 2001 and reduced back to 25% in 2004, where it remains in 2008. Graveney School converted to become an academy on 1 August 2011.

Years 7 to 11
When students begin their life at Graveney in Year 7, they are placed into sets depending on their Year 6 SATs, their Wandsworth test result and the recommendation letter of their previous teacher. Students can either be put into Extension (4 classes), Enrichment (3 classes) or Endeavour (2 classes). Students can be moved across sets depending on their ability. However, most remain in their assigned stream.
Students in one Endeavour class receive personal mentoring by the school, with their tutor often being a member of the special needs department.

Years 7 to 9
Extension and Enrichment study one Modern Foreign Language. These could either be French or Spanish. From Year 8 onwards, there is an opportunity to do twilight classes, which means students can study an additional Modern Foreign Language e.g. German, French or Spanish.

Years 10 to 11
After Christmas of year 9, usually February or March, students pick their GCSE options. English Language and Literature, Maths, Science and PE are compulsory for the two years. 
Up to three additional subjects are usually chosen, depending on predicted potential, with high-attaining students given the option to do 'Twilight' Drama, or Astronomy as an extra out of school GCSE.

With regards to Science, the majority of students do the Triple Science award - a GCSE for Biology, Chemistry and Physics, whereas some do the combined science award.

The results of the Year 9 exams determine what sets the students will be in.

The Sixth Form
Graveney School also has a large sixth form college, offering a range subjects to study at A-level. The sixth form is open for application to both internal students (students that studied at Graveney School), and external candidates (students that received their secondary education elsewhere).

The sixth form offers a range of subjects that were not available to take at GCSE level, such as Film Studies, Government & Politics, Further Mathematics, Philosophy, Photography and Psychology, though some of these subjects will only run if a substantial number of students apply to it. Students can also retake GCSEs. The sixth form has minimum entry requirements of 5 A*-Cs at GCSE level for internal students, and 7 A*-Cs for external applicants. For a student to graduate from year 12 to year 13, they must have attained minimum grades of two Es at AS level.

The sixth form does not have a uniform policy, however students must wear their ID card visibly at all times. Yeva Reynolds is party of the notable alumni at Graveney sixth form. Emma Sampson, an external student frequently wears her lanyard to abide by school policy.

Site and buildings
Graveney initially operated on both the former Furzedown and Ensham sites; however, the Ensham building was soon closed and the school now occupies what was Furzedown Secondary School on either side of Welham Road in Tooting, south west London.

The part of the site on the southern side of Welham Road is the former Rosa Bassett School, the main building of which was opened in 1913. The larger area to the north of the road is the former Furzedown Training College (a teacher training college), which was opened in 1915. The buildings surround a tree-lined campus and include Furzedown House, a Grade II-listed Georgian house, built in 1794.

The other buildings include: Red House, College House, Lower School, Upper Science, Lower Science, Atkins Technology Centre, the Tech block, an independent study centre, The Oppenheimer Observatory, a sports hall and a multigym.

Each building is dedicated to two or more subjects.

 Red House - English, Economics and Business Studies, Media Studies, Film Studies, and Drama
 Furzedown House - Art, Music, Drama and English
 Theatre - Drama and English
 College House - Maths, IT, Sports Studies, Citizenship and PSHE
 Lower School - Languages, History, IT, Sociology, Archaeology, Critical Thinking, PSHE, Citizenship and Government & Politics
 Lower Science - Biology, Chemistry and Physics
 Upper Science - Biology, Chemistry and Physics
 Atkins Technology Centre - Electronics, Resistant Materials and Graphics
 Technology Block - Food, Textiles and Media Studies
 Sixth Form Study Centre - Study area for Sixth Form students only which doubles as an assembly hall
 Bradford House - Psychology, Sociology, Maths for Sixth Form students only
The Oppenheimer Observatory - Geography, Religious studies, Philosophy and Astronomy
 Sports Hall - Sports Studies and PE
 Multigym - Sports Studies and PE

On the north side of Welham Road, there is also a recreation area which is owned by Wandsworth Council but used by Graveney during school hours for Sports Studies and PE lessons. The area consists of a small running track, an astro turf pitch, 2 tennis courts which can be converted into another pitch and a cricket area.

Headteachers and principals
 1986–1989 John A. Phillips, BA (Oxon)
 1989– Graham Stapleton, MA (Cantab) (now principal)

John Phillips had been headmaster of both Battersea Grammar and Furzedown Secondary Schools prior to his appointment at Graveney.

Graveney now has a separate principal and headteacher (first vice-principal); the most recent headteacher was Keith Barbrook, who left in 2017.

House system
Graveney's traditional three houses were St. John's, Rosa Basset and Ensham. However, after the Summer of 2018, two new houses have been added: Furzedown and Battersea.

 St. John's (pronounced "Sinjun's") – named after Sir Walter St John, 3rd Baronet, who founded the school that became Battersea Grammar School; the house emblem, a gold falcon, is derived from the crest on Sir Walter's coat of arms. Motto: Gloria Brevis, Honor Longus.
 Rosa Bassett – named after Rosa Bassett, the first headmistress of County Secondary School Streatham, which became Rosa Bassett School. The house's motto, Honesta Obtinete, and the scarlet pimpernel emblem are both taken from those of Rosa Bassett School.
 Ensham – named after Ensham school. Motto: Per Ardua Ad Alta.

Year forms
Years 7 to 9 consist of ten forms, whilst years 10 and 11 consist of nine forms. The forms break down into: 3/4 extension band forms, 3 Enrichment band forms and 3 Endeavour band forms.

Notable alumni
Daniel Trilling, journalist and former editor of New Humanist
 Naga Munchetty, newsreader on BBC News and TV presenter
 Amol Rajan, BBC Media Editor and former editor of The Independent newspaper.
 Ramona Marquez, Outnumbered actress
Quillan Isidore, Team GB BMX cyclist. Nominated for BBC Young Sports Personality of the Year Award 2012 (losing to eventual winner, Josef Craig)
 Kyle Sinckler, Rugby player, Bristol, England and the British and Irish Lions
 Hero Fiennes Tiffin, Actor
 Ethan Hayter, World Champion track cyclist
Jamael Westman, actor. Nominated for an Olivier Award in 2018 for playing the titular role in the West End production of Hamilton
Dami Bakare, British volleyball player. Represented Team GB in the 2012 Summer Olympics.
Grace Wales Bonner, British fashion designer, founder of London-based label Wales Bonner.

References

External links
 
 Old Grammarians' Association

Academies in the London Borough of Wandsworth
Secondary schools in the London Borough of Wandsworth
Tooting